The Suez Canal Bridge, also known as the Egyptian–Japanese Friendship Bridge, Al Salam Bridge, Al Salam Peace Bridge or Mubarak Peace Bridge, is a road bridge crossing the Suez Canal at El-Qantara, whose name means "the bridge" in Egyptian Arabic. The bridge links the continents of Africa and Asia.

Design and construction

The bridge was built with assistance from the Japanese government.  The main contractor was Kajima Corporation.

The Japanese grant, accounting for 60% of the construction cost (or 13.5 billion yen), was agreed to during the visit of then-President Hosni Mubarak to Japan in March 1995, as part of a larger project to develop the Sinai Peninsula. Egypt bore the remaining 40% (9 billion yen). The bridge was opened in October 2001.

The height of the two main pylons supporting the main span is  each. The towers were designed in the shape of Pharaonic obelisks.

Significant developments in the region

The Suez Canal Bridge was part of a major drive to develop the areas surrounding the Suez Canal, including other projects such as the Ahmed Hamdi Tunnel under the Suez Canal (completed in 1981), the El Ferdan Railway Bridge, and the Suez Canal overhead powerline crossing.

References

External links

Embassy of Japan in Egypt: Economic Cooperation ( Official Development Assistance, ODA )
Planning, design and construction aspects of the Suez Canal cable stayed bridge

Cable-stayed bridges in Egypt
Bridge, Suez Canal Bridge
Bridges completed in 2001
21st-century architecture in Egypt